BMW of North America, Inc. v. Gore, 517 U.S. 559 (1996), was a United States Supreme Court case limiting punitive damages under the Due Process Clause of the Fourteenth Amendment.

Facts
The plaintiff, Dr. Ira Gore, bought a new BMW, and later discovered that the vehicle had been repainted before he bought it. Defendant BMW of North America revealed that their policy was to sell damaged cars as new if the damage could be fixed for less than 3% of the cost of the car. Dr. Gore sued, and an Alabama jury awarded $4,000 in compensatory damages (lost value of the car) and $4 million in punitive damages, which was later reduced to $2 million by the Alabama Supreme Court. The punitive damages resulted not only from Dr. Gore's damages, but from BMW's egregious behavior across a broad spectrum of BMW purchasers over a multi-year period of time in which BMW repaired damaged vehicles and sold them as new to unsuspecting buyers as a matter of routine business operation. The decision of the Alabama Supreme Court was then appealed to the United States Supreme Court.

Issue
Whether excessively high punitive damages violate the Due Process clause of the Constitution.

Opinion of the Court
The Court, in an opinion by Justice Stevens, found that the excessively high punitive damages in this case violate the Due Process clause. For punitive damages to stand, the damages must be reasonably necessary to vindicate the State's legitimate interest in punishment and deterrence. Punitive damages may not be "grossly excessive" – if they are, then they violate substantive due process.

The Supreme Court applied three factors in making this determination:
 The degree of reprehensibility of the defendant's conduct;
 The ratio to the compensatory damages awarded (actual or potential harm inflicted on the plaintiff); and
 Comparison of the punitive damages award and civil or criminal penalties that could be imposed for comparable misconduct.

Using these factors, the Court found that BMW's conduct was not particularly reprehensible (no reckless disregard for health or safety, nor even evidence of bad faith). The ratio of actual or potential damages to punitive damages was suspiciously high. Finally, the criminal sanctions available for similar conduct were limited to $2,000, making the $2 million assessment the equivalent of a severe criminal penalty.

The Court noted, however, that these three factors can be over-ridden if it is "necessary to deter future conduct".

Dissenting opinions were written by Justice Scalia and Justice Ginsburg, both contending that the Constitution was not implicated here, raising principles of federalism.

Aftermath 
On remand, the Supreme Court of Alabama ordered a new trial unless plaintiff accepted a remittitur of all but $50,000 of the punitive damages awarded. The court reasoned that it may not have given sufficient weight to the degree of reprehensibility of BMW's conduct, and selected the $50,000 as in the range of other Alabama verdicts in cases of repaired cars being sold as new.

Federalism questions
In an academic article, following the arguments raised by the dissenting justices, Patrick Hubbard has questioned the appropriateness of federal courts reading substantive rights into the Due Process Clause of the United States Constitution in order to preempt the role of state courts and legislatures. These same people say the Court should not spend its time as a "super jury", second-guessing jury verdicts, but rather, "[T]he court should be more deferential to state courts and legislatures, and more concerned with developing a coherent framework."

See also 
 State Farm v. Campbell (2003)
 List of United States Supreme Court cases, volume 517
 List of United States Supreme Court cases
 Lists of United States Supreme Court cases by volume
 List of United States Supreme Court cases by the Rehnquist Court

References

External links
 
 
"Bad enough to punish: The application of the responsibility guidepost in punitive damages cases after BMW v. Gore" Federation of Insurance & Corporate Counsel Quarterly, Fall 1998

United States Supreme Court cases
United States tort case law
1996 in United States case law
BMW
United States Supreme Court cases of the Rehnquist Court